Toxotai (singular:) were Ancient Greek and Byzantine archers.
During the ancient period they were armed with a short Greek bow and a short sword. They carried a little pelte (or pelta) shield.

Hippotoxotai (ἱπποτοξόται) were mounted archers and rode ahead of the cavalry.

The term toxotes was used to describe the mythic Sagittarius, a legendary creature thought to be a centaur.

Unlike cavalry or hoplites, toxotai tended to come from the lower classes of citizens, at least in Athens. They were viewed with prejudice by both the elite and the non-elite in Greek society, many of their contemporaries thought of them as cowards. Classical Athenians usually defined courage in terms of what hoplites remaining steadfast in the face of danger, accepting the possibility of injury or death. Archers never put themselves in physical danger, and thus were not courageous.

References

Ancient Greek archers
Ancient Greek infantry types
Ancient Greek military terminology
Military units and formations of ancient Greece
Military archers